is a Japanese anime television series based on a manga by Shotaro Ishinomori. It ran for 49 episodes and was animated by Studio Gallop. Directed by Takashi Watanabe, the anime closely follows the adventures of Dome Shinjo, a 10-year-old boy who is the son of a deceased legendary player of Yomiuri Giants.

Plot
Dome Shinjo inherited the love for baseball and his great abilities for the sport from his father even if his mother and his elder sister try to discourage him from practicing the same. Before dying, Dome's father had time to teach him a magical shot. After his father died and his mother gave him the glove his father used, he made the same shot in a training session of the Giants and was contracted immediately.

With the support of veteran players in the team, this young player made the Giants unbeatable in their home ground and none of the main batters in the Japanese professional league managed to get past his magical shot. This unanimous victory however does not apply to games abroad since Dome is just allowed to play in the Tokyo Dome—after which he was named and where his father was consecrated as well.

When the veteran captain of the Dragons manages to bat his shot, this young boy finally tastes defeat but quickly bounces back after inventing a new magical shot. New rivals and friends like Melody Norman, an American girl who disguises herself as a boy because women aren't allowed to play the sport enter the scene along with the mysterious Don Carlos, a Spanish ex-bullfighter who plays for the Hiroshima Toyo Carp and had an old rivalry with his father.

Voicing Cast
Chika Sakamoto as Dome Shinjo.
Kikuko Inoue as Mayumi Shinjo.
Rena Kurihara as Akane Shinjo.
Satomi Kōrogi as Kaori.

External links

References 

1989 anime television series debuts
1989 Japanese television series debuts
1990 Japanese television series endings
Gallop (studio)
Nippon TV original programming
Baseball in anime and manga
Shotaro Ishinomori